Drupang is a small village of Lakhimpur district in Assam, India.

References

Villages in Lakhimpur district